White Mile is a 1994 American made-for-television thriller-drama film directed by Robert Butler and starring Alan Alda, Peter Gallagher and Robert Loggia. It originally premiered on HBO on May 21, 1994.

Plot summary 
Dan Cutler, the head of an advertising agency, invites his colleagues to a whitewater rafting trip. The invitation feels more like an order to some, Cutler considering the outing a test of his employees' confidence, courage and skills. Retired agency executive Nick Karas is a last minute addition, wanting to help Cutler secure some clients and believing that it is a simple fishing trip.

Tragedy occurs along Canada's "White Mile," when the inflatable carrying the large group capsizes, and all are swept away by the raging current. Two agency executives, retiree Karas and two clients die. Later, Cutler becomes at odds with Jack Robbins, one of his top executives, over how the aftermath should be portrayed to authorities and to relatives who are suing the company.

Cast 
Alan Alda as Dan Cutler
Peter Gallagher as Jack Robbins
Robert Loggia as Nick Karas
Bruce Altman as David Koenig
Fionnula Flanagan as Gena Karas
Jack Gilpin as Peter Wiederhorn
Ken Jenkins as Jerry Taggart
Dakin Matthews as Andy Thornell
Don McManus as Art Stefanoff
Robert Picardo as Tom Horton

Background
The film is loosely based on a rafting accident, on August 1, 1987, on the White Mile rapids in the Bidwell Canyon section of the Chilko River, in the Central Interior of British Columbia, Canada. Current and retired executives of Chicago agency DDB Needham (DDB), along with clients from Kraft, Clorox, Procter & Gamble (P&G), Drug Free America Foundation (DFAF) and other major companies, were involved in the incident.  Like the film, five men died that day—two current and one retired DDB executives, and one executive each from P&G and DFAF.  As in the film, the court assigned a payout of $1.1 million to the family of the retired DDB executive who died that day.

Awards and honors 
The film was nominated for two Golden Globes: "Best Mini-Series or Motion Picture Made for TV" and Alan Alda was nominated for "Best Performance by an Actor in a Mini-Series or Motion Picture Made for TV"
The film was nominated for an Emmy Award for "Outstanding Individual Achievement in Sound Editing for a Miniseries or a Special"
John Duffy was nominated for an Eddie for "Best Edited Motion Picture for Non-Commercial Television"

Soundtrack 
"The Song of the Marines" by Harry Warren and Al Dubin

References

External links 

1994 television films
1994 films
1994 action thriller films
1990s English-language films
1990s thriller drama films
Action films based on actual events
Action television films
American films based on actual events
American business films
American thriller drama films
American thriller television films
Drama films based on actual events
American drama television films
Films about businesspeople
Films directed by Robert Butler
Films set in British Columbia
HBO Films films
Rafting films
Television films based on actual events
Thriller films based on actual events
1990s American films